Ngouboua is a village in Chad. In February 2015, it was attacked by Boko Haram. In November 2022, many Chadian soldiers were killed by militants.

References

Populated places in Chad